Suhada Koka is a 2015 Sri Lankan Sinhala political comedy film directed by Giriraj Kaushalya and produced by Ravindra Guruge for TVT Films. It stars Vijaya Nandasiri and Kusum Renu in lead roles along with Rodney Warnakula and Lal Kularatne. Music co-composed by Rohana Weerasinghe and Kapila Pugalarachchi. It is the 1237th Sri Lankan film in the Sinhala cinema.

Plot
The film starts with a release of peoples' vote of government election, where Rajamanthri (Vijaya) lost his seat and crying with his allies. However, his secretary Sumanasiri (Rodney) revealed that the winning member has been hospitalized after hearing the shocking news of that he won the election of the seat. Rajamanthri and crew went to the hospital and finally the winning member died and Rajamanthri won the seat. After winning the seat, he started to celebrate the win, but his fellow ministers (Priyantha and Jayasiri) started to make actions against him. However, with many funny incidents, Rajamanthri pass all the battles with the help of his allies. Meanwhile, Liyana Mahaththaya (Lal), clark (Mihira) and Kalu mudalali (Giriraj) proposed an Awurudu Ulela to impress Chief minister Narendrasinghe (Sathischandra). Rajamanthri participated all the events of Awurudu Ulela and won all of them by cunning methods of his allies. Meanwhile, Rajamanthri make gossips about the other ministers and seek to attain his place in the higher cabinet minister place. With these rumors, Chief minister starts to avoid Gajasinghe (Jayasiri) and remove him from the cabinet. For the vacancy, he appointed Rajamanthri as the new cabinet member. For the ceremony, he started to dress up very majestically and when Rajamanthri make his way to the appointing ceremony. His allies also wanted to go with him, but Rajamanthri refuses it and say that "Now I'm not the ordinary Rajamanthri, I'm now a cabinet minister and I have no time to be with you all". Rajamanthri with his wife Malini (Kusum) went to the function and his five allies make sad and surprise expressions to each other.

Cast
 Vijaya Nandasiri as Rajamanthri
 Kusum Renu as Malini
 Rodney Warnakula as Sumanasiri
 Saman Hemarathna as Sumudu
 Lal Kularatne as Liyana Mahaththaya
 Giriraj Kaushalya as Kalu Mudalali
 Mihira Sirithilaka as Clerk
 Sathischandra Edirisinghe as Minister Narendrasinghe
 W. Jayasiri as Minister Gajanayake
 Priyantha Seneviratne as Minister
 Damitha Abeyratne as Lady in queue
 Rathna Sumanapala as Sumudu's granny
 Damitha Saluwadana as Neighbour

Soundtrack

References

External links
සුහද කොකා ඉගිළෙද්දී සිදු වූ රස කතා

2015 films
2010s Sinhala-language films
2010s political comedy films
Sri Lankan comedy films
Sri Lankan political films
2015 comedy films